The 2023 FIA World Rally Championship-2 is the eleventh season of the World Rally Championship-2, an auto racing championship for rally cars that is recognised by the Fédération Internationale de l'Automobile as the second-highest tier of international rallying. The category is open to cars entered by teams and complying with Group Rally2. The championship began in January 2023 with the Rallye Monte-Carlo and is due to conclude in November 2023 with Rally Japan, and will run in support of the 2023 World Rally Championship.

Emil Lindholm and Reeta Hämäläinen are the defending drivers' and co-drivers' champions, while Toksport WRT are the defending teams' champions.

Calendar

Entries
The following teams and crews are under contract to contest the 2023 World Rally Championship-2. Teams entering two crews are eligible for Teams' Championship points.

Regulation changes
The junior championships of the class, WRC-2 Junior, is set to be renamed as WRC-2 Challenger to focus on the experience of the competitors instead of age, while the masters series are set to be opened to Rally2, Rally3, Rally4, Rally5 and R-GT competitors.

Results and standings

Season summary

Scoring system
Points are awarded to the top ten classified finishers in each event. Power Stage points are also awarded in the drivers' and co-drivers' championships, with three points awarded to the first place finisher on the stage, two to second place, and one to third. A team has to enter two cars to score points in an event. Drivers and teams must nominate a scoring rally when they enter the event and the best six scores from seven nominated rallies will count towards the final classification. Registered drivers are able to enter additional rallies with Priority 2 status without scoring points.

FIA World Rally Championship-2 for Drivers

FIA World Rally Championship-2 for Co-Drivers

FIA World Rally Championship-2 for Teams

FIA Challenger World Rally Championship-2 for Drivers

FIA Challenger World Rally Championship-2 for Co-Drivers

Notes

References

External links
  
 FIA World Rally Championship-2 2023 at eWRC-results.com
 FIA World Rally Championship-2 Challenger 2023 at eWRC-results.com

 
WRC-2
World Rally Championship-2